Damián Emanuel Cataldo (born 1 August 1998) is an Argentine professional footballer who plays as a midfielder for Deportes Vallenar.

Career
Cataldo made his senior breakthrough with Independiente Rivadavia, moving into the club's squad during the 2018–19 Primera B Nacional season. He was an unused substitute for a 0–1 win away to Los Andes on 25 August 2018, prior to making his bow in professional football in September against Platense. He departed the club in mid-2019, subsequently having a six-month stint in Liga Mendocina with Gutiérrez. In 2020, Cataldo joined Chilean Segunda División side Deportes Vallenar.

Career statistics
.

References

External links

1998 births
Living people
Place of birth missing (living people)
Argentine footballers
Association football midfielders
Argentine expatriate footballers
Expatriate footballers in Chile
Argentine expatriate sportspeople in Chile
Primera Nacional players
Independiente Rivadavia footballers
Deportes Vallenar footballers